Dancemania 4 is the fourth set in the Dancemania series of dance music compilation albums, released in early 1997 by EMI Music Japan.

With its 23 tracks and one bonus track, the album debuted at #6 on Oricon's weekly album chart in January 1997 and reached #3 the next week, appearing on the yearly best-selling album chart at #92 in 1997 with 241,570 copies sold, along with its successor, 5, which ranked #98.

Several tracks on the album, including different remixes, can also be found on other Dancemania albums such as 1, Delux, Extra, Diamond, Diamond Complete Edition, Best Yellow, Best Red, Zip Mania, Zip Mania DX, Zip Mania Best, Bass #1, Speed 3 or Winters.


Tracks

Further details

The album's overall average tempo is 140 bpm;
The slowest track is "Dub-I-Dub" (#24) at 72 bpm.
The fastest track is "We Shall Dance" (#21) at 177 bpm.
Several tracks are cover versions or remix versions.
#6 "Killing Me Softly" is a cover remix version of Roberta Flack's "Killing Me Softly with His Song".
#9 "What Becomes of the Broken Hearted?" is a cover version of Jimmy Ruffin's "What Becomes of the Brokenhearted".
#15 "Stay" is a cover version of Jackson Browne's "Stay".
#21 "We Shall Dance" is a cover remix version of Demis Roussos's "We Shall Dance".
#24 "Dub-I-Dub", included as bonus track, is a cover version of Me & My's "Dub-I-Dub".
The non-stop mixing was done by DJ Smurf a.k.a. Paul Rincon and his partner, Dip "T" Jones, who has co-produced many remixes with Smurf.

References

4
1997 compilation albums
Dance music compilation albums